Mont-Laurier is a town and incorporated municipality in northwest Quebec, Canada, located on the banks of the Lièvre River (Rivière du Lièvre), a tributary of the Ottawa River. Known as the "Capital of the Haute-Laurentides", the motto of the town is Laurus elationis praemium, which translates to "Lift the laurels of reward". The demonym for its inhabitants is Lauriermontois.

According to the 2021 Canadian census, the population of Mont-Laurier is 14,180. It is the seat of Antoine-Labelle Regional County Municipality and the judicial district of Labelle.

History
The territory was originally inhabited by Oueskarinis, a sub tribe of Algonquians. The European settlers came from Sainte-Adèle in 1866, and the place was originally called Rapide-de-l'Orignal (English: Moose Rapids) in 1885, by Solime Alix. The name referred to, according to a legend, a panicked moose that made a huge leap at a waterfall on the Lièvre River. On Octobre 14, 1909, the place was incorporated as the Village Municipality of Mont-Laurier by separating from the Township Municipality of Campbell (founded in 1900). It was named in honour of Canadian Prime Minister Sir Wilfrid Laurier.

Just before the founding of the village municipality, the railway from Montreal through the Laurentides reached Mont-Laurier, with the first train arriving on September 15, 1909. Two months later the station was completed. As the terminus of the railway, it served as transit point for passengers and a center for receiving and shipping goods,  handling between 100 and 125 freight cars every week. Freight wagons from Montreal brought coal, oil, or any other merchandise, while returning wagons were full of wood and animals. In 1940, a road from Mont-Laurier to Abitibi was built. This facilitated the growth of the trucking industry. Increased use of the road in the 1960s led to the decline of the railroad.

In 1950, Mont-Laurier changed statutes and became a ville. In 1971, it merged with the Township Municipality of Brunet (that succeeded Campbell Township in 1953).

On November 13, 1981, the P'tit train du Nord made its last passenger trip to Mont-Laurier, followed by the end of freight transport towards the end of the 1980s.

In 2003, Mont-Laurier merged with the neighbouring towns Des Ruisseaux and Saint-Aimé-du-Lac-des-Îles, with the name Mont-Laurier being chosen for the combined municipality. Following a 2004 demerger referendum vote, Saint-Aimé-du-Lac-des-Îles left Mont-Laurier in 2006 to be reconstituted as an independent municipality. The de-amalgamation did not affect Des Ruisseaux, which remains part of Mont-Laurier.

Geography
In addition to Mont-Laurier, the municipality also consists of the following population centres: Lac-Gatineau, Saint-Jean-sur-le-Lac, and Val-Limoges.

Its location in the Laurentians places it at an altitude of 244 metres above mean sea level. It is surrounded by numerous lakes and mixed forests that support hunting, fishing and leisure, and the mainstay logging industry.

Route 309 follows the Lievre and leads to Gatineau, Quebec and Ottawa, Ontario,  to the south.

Climate
Mont-Laurier has a humid continental climate (Dfb). It is strongly influenced by its inland position, with significant differences between the warm summers and the very cold winters. Precipitation is high year-round, causing significant snow cover in winter.

Demographics 

Population trend (prior to amalgamation):
 Population in 2001:
 Des Ruisseaux: 5401
 Mont-Laurier: 7365
 Population in 1996:
 Des Ruisseaux: 5139
 Mont-Laurier: 8007
 Population in 1991:
 Des Ruisseaux: 4449
 Mont-Laurier: 7862

Mother tongue:
 English as first language: 0.2%
 French as first language: 98.5%
 English and French as first language: 0.1%
 Other as first language: 1.2%

Economy
Mont-Laurier is the administrative and commercial centre of the Haute-Lievre area. Many residents are employed by the various governments, the schools and the hospital. Most of the economic activity is generated by tourism, road transport and forestry. There is some agriculture, mostly dairy farming, and dairy products manufacturing.

Local government
Michel Adrien, a black immigrant to Canada from Haiti, was elected mayor in 2003 with an 80% majority (in a town where more than 95% of the population are Caucasian, and less than 1% of the population are Black Canadians). With no opponent running against him, Adrien was reelected through acclamation in 2005, 2007 and 2009. In addition to a mayoral leader, the municipality is governed by a city council.

Former mayors

List of former mayors:
 Michel Adrien (2003–2017)
 Daniel Bourdon (2017–present)

Notable people
Sylvain Pagé, member of L'Assemblée nationale du Québec
Yvon Charbonneau, Union leader
Dan Cloutier, National Hockey League Goaltender
Michel Melançon, Drummer, "Emerson Drive"
Jocelyn Lemieux, Retired NHL Player
Bobby Bazini, singer-songwriter

See also
List of cities in Quebec
Mont-Laurier Airport
Parc Linéaire Le P'tit Train du Nord - railtrail to Mont-Laurier

References

Coursol, Luc, Histoire de Mont-Laurier, 1940–1990, Les éditions Luc Coursol, 1991.

External links

Ville de Mont-Laurier

 
Cities and towns in Quebec